Lenasia, also known as Lenz, is a suburb south of Soweto in the Gauteng province, South Africa, originally created to house Indians. It is part of the City of Johannesburg Metropolitan Municipality. Lenasia is approximately 35 kilometres southwest of the Johannesburg Central Business District and 45 kilometres south of the Sandton Central Business District.

History

Early history
Apartheid-era planners situated the group area for Johannesburg's Indians near the Lenz Military Base. It originates from 1958. The name "Lenasia" is thought to be a combination of the words "Lenz" and "Asia". The Lenz in question was one Captain Lenz who owned the original plot on which Lenasia is situated. According to Parnell and Pirie the foundations for Lenasia were laid in 1963. Many of its early residents were forcibly removed under the Group Areas Act from Pageview and the portion of Vrededorp populated by non whites (jointly known as Fietas) and Fordsburg, areas close to the Johannesburg city centre, to Lenasia. As segregation grew it became the largest place where people of Indian extraction could legally live in the Transvaal Province.

In 1899, the Vanwyksrust Fort and Gaol of the ZAR was built around the same time as the Old Fort at Constitution Hill in Braamfontein. Only remnants now remain of the original structure on the corner of the Golden Highway and the R554 -.

On the north-western outskirts of Lenasia, west of the Klip River wetland and alongside the N12 highway, is the Zuurbekom Pumphouse. Its purpose was to extract and provide the water from the dolomite rocks under the vast wetland to Central Witwatersrand. In 1975, it was declared a National Monument, and subsequently made into a Provincial Heritage Site in 2000.

In 1910, Gandhi was gifted land by Hermann Kallenbach on the outskirts of Lenasia, and established the Tolstoy Farm; it is now situated on land owned by Corobrik. On it is a museum and training centre.

On the 27th September 1992, Nelson Mandela gave an address at the opening of the Gandhi Hall.

Geography

Cityscape
The township is large, and divided into extensions (Extensions 1-13) including a major suburb south of Lenasia, called Lenasia South and referred to as Daxina by the locals. Above Nirvana Drive (a section of the R554), is the Olifantsvlei Nature Reserve, a protected wetland area.

Communities
 
The younger generation tends to travel out of Lenasia to work for the big corporates. The growing population of Lenasia is a huge concern, as no additional land is being zoned for suburban development. Hence properties soar to exorbitant prices, making it more and more difficult for entry level income earners to afford to live there.

Many of the younger generations are now beginning to move out of the suburb because of increasing home prices, major traffic congestion en route to the city, as well as wanting to live in a more multicultural environment.

Although still a predominantly Indian area, Lenasia today is a more cosmopolitan and diverse suburb, providing a place to live for local coloured and African people, as well as recent immigrants and refugees.

Climate
Weather in Lenasia is typically 2-3 degrees cooler than central Johannesburg due to the town being situated within a valley.

Economy
Lenasia is now a vibrant and thriving community. The rapidly growing suburb has shopping malls (Trade Route Mall & Signet Terrace Shopping Centre), churches, temples, mosques, banks and various industrial and commercial sectors such as Kulfi Ice-cream and DB Sweets which are familiar household business names. 
It also boasts takeaways such as Akhalwayas known for its famous fish and chips and Delhi Delicious for its pies.

It also boasts numerous other restaurants with well known franchises such as KFC, Wimpy, McDonald's and Burger King.

There are several prominent publications and newspapers based in Lenasia such as Lenasia Times, and the Rising Sun Newspaper.

Four satellite radio stations, Radio Islam, Eastwave FM, Channel Islam International and Lenz Fm broadcast from Lenasia.

Lenasia embraced the digital age when in 2002 a community website lenzinfo was launched, which keeps the community informed on happenings, sports events, religious and cultural activities and general information.

Law and government

Government
It is located in Region G of the City of Johannesburg Metropolitan Municipality.

Politics
The community of Lenasia played a prominent role in opposing the national tricameral elections held in 1984 and 1989 under the apartheid era National Party government. This was an attempt to create separate legislative assemblies in South Africa for Whites, Indians and Coloureds in order to entrench racial segregation and perpetuate the disenfranchisement of the African majority in South Africa. Lenasia also played a role in the creation and activities of the United Democratic Front (UDF), the mass democratic movement that opposed apartheid in the 1980s and early 1990s before the unbanning of the African National Congress. Many of Lenasia's residents played a prominent role in the UDF structures and the broader anti-apartheid movement. Some of these activists became senior political figures after the first national democratic elections in 1994.

Parks and greenspace

Rose Park a popular venue amongst Lenasia residents for public events and for family relaxation on weekends. The park, which consists of aesthetically-pleasant rose bushes and a fountain, also has a special stimulation and play area that are specifically for children with disabilities. It also featured as a fan park during the 2010 FIFA World Cup.

Rose Park is also the venue for the popular parkrun', which takes place every Saturday at 8am.

Sport

Cricket
 The GM LPL (Lenasia Premier League) is a prominent annual Twenty20-styled cricket tournament played during September. It commenced in 2010.

Religious places

Hinduism

Shree Rameshwar Mahadev Mandir

Shree Rameshwar Mahadev Mandir is situated in Lenasia. The Mandir was built by the community, for the Community in 1988. The main aim is to promote, support, and perpetuate the worship of Shree Rameshwar Mahadev, to celebrate religious festivals, holy days & charitable events, and the continuous worship & spiritual guidance from Shree Rameshwar Mahadev.

BAPS Shri Swaminarayan Mandir

Noted residents

Feroza Adam, political activist
Candice Morgan, actor and Miss Deaf World SA
Ahmed Kathrada, ANC activist
Mahatma Gandhi, led protests against colonial British rule at Lenasia Train Station
Abu Baker Asvat, medical doctor and political activist

References

External links

 Lenasia's Very Own Website
 Lenasia Times Newspaper (town's oldest publication)
 https://web.archive.org/web/20081003085734/http://lenzwatch.co.za/
 Lenasia Crime Alert
 Lenasia News & Events Publication
 https://web.archive.org/web/20140517225726/http://lenasiainfo.com/
 Sporting history of Lenasia
 Lakshmi Narayan Temple, Ramakrishna Vedanta Society

Johannesburg Region G
Former Indian townships in South Africa
Townships in Gauteng